Charles Frederick Grey CBE (25 March 1903 – 7 September 1984) was a British miner and politician. He was also an independent Methodist Minister.

Early life and education 
Grey had an elementary school education and went to work in the Durham coalfield when he left school at 14. He became involved in Labour Party activities, and for many years was on the Executive Committee of the Divisional Labour Party.

Career 
At the 1945 general election, Grey was chosen as Labour candidate for Durham. Although centred on the cathedral city, most of the voters lived in nearby mining villages and Grey was elected.

In 1962, Grey was named as the Northern Area whip for the Parliamentary Labour Party. When Labour won the 1964 general election he became a government whip as Comptroller of Her Majesty's Household. He was promoted to Treasurer of Her Majesty's Household in July 1966. In October 1969 he gave up office and announced his retirement.

Out of parliament, Grey was President of the Independent Methodist Connexion in 1971. He was given the Freedom of the City of Durham in 1971, and was awarded an honorary degree by the University of Durham in 1976.

References

 M. Stenton and S. Lees, "Who's Who of British MPs" (Harvester Press, 1981)

External links 
 

1903 births
1984 deaths
Commanders of the Order of the British Empire
Labour Party (UK) MPs for English constituencies
Members of the Parliament of the United Kingdom for City of Durham
Methodist ministers
Ministers in the Wilson governments, 1964–1970
National Union of Mineworkers-sponsored MPs
Treasurers of the Household
UK MPs 1945–1950
UK MPs 1950–1951
UK MPs 1951–1955
UK MPs 1955–1959
UK MPs 1959–1964
UK MPs 1964–1966
UK MPs 1966–1970